Francis or Francesco I Acciaioli was the son of Nerio II Acciaioli by his second wife Chiara Zorzi. He succeeded on his father's death in 1451 to the Duchy of Athens under his mother's regency.

His mother married the Venetian Bartolomeo Contarini (1453). However, Mehmet II, the Ottoman sultan, intervened at the insistence of the people on the behalf of the young duke Francis and summoned Bartolommeo and Chiara to his court at Adrianople. Another Acciaioli, Francesco II, was sent to Athens as a Turkish client duke. Evidently, the citizenry had mistrusted the two lovers influence over the young duke, for whose safety they may have feared. The young Francesco I remained at the court of the Ottoman sultan.

References
Setton, Kenneth M. (general editor) A History of the Crusades: Volume III — The Fourteenth and Fifteenth Centuries. Harry W. Hazard, editor. University of Wisconsin Press: Madison, 1975. 
Setton, Kenneth M. Catalan Domination of Athens 1311–1380. Revised edition. Variorum: London, 1975.

Acciaioli family
Dukes of Athens
15th-century monarchs in Europe
15th-century Italian nobility